Neville Lumb are a supplier of commercial sanitaryware, part of the Saint-Gobain group.

History
The business was founded in 1882 by George H. Cakebread and Arthur E. Robey as Cakebread Robey & Company and became an important supplier of engraved and stained glass to public houses and hotels in England, such as The Queen's Hotel (now The Queens pub) in Crouch End, The Salisbury in Harringay, and St Andrew's church, Chase Side, in Southgate. They were based at Stoke Newington and from around 1914 at Caroba Works, Wood Green, north London. The supply of sanitary fittings was also an important part of their business, and now their principal activity.

References

External links 

 
http://www.gracesguide.co.uk/Cakebread-Robey_and_Co
http://paintedsignsandmosaics.blogspot.co.uk/2010/07/cakebread-robey-co-ltd.html

Companies based in Coventry
Stoke Newington
Companies established in 1882
Wood Green
British stained glass artists and manufacturers
Saint-Gobain